Maple Roads is a historic plantation house located near  Keysville, Charlotte County, Virginia.  It was built in the early-19th century, and is a two-story, five-bay, brick dwelling in the Federal style.  It is a single-pile I-house with a -story rear wing.  Also on the property are a contributing 19th century one-room wood framed office with a steep standing seam metal gable roof, a simple early-20th century wood frame barn, and a family cemetery.

It was listed on the National Register of Historic Places in 2002.

References

Plantation houses in Virginia
Houses on the National Register of Historic Places in Virginia
Federal architecture in Virginia
Houses in Charlotte County, Virginia
National Register of Historic Places in Charlotte County, Virginia